Noxon is a census-designated place (CDP) in Sanders County, Montana, United States. The population of the whole CDP was 218 at the 2010 census.

It was established in 1883 as a Northern Pacific Railroad station.

Nearby is the Noxon Rapids Dam.

Geography
Noxon is located at  (47.992840, -115.773149).

Climate
This climatic region is typified by large seasonal temperature differences, with warm to hot (and often humid) summers and cold (sometimes severely cold) winters.  According to the Köppen Climate Classification system, Noxon has a humid continental climate, abbreviated "Dfb" on climate maps.

Demographics

As of the census of 2010, there were 218 people, 127 households, and 66 families residing in the CDP. The population density was 183.2 people per square mile (70.5/km). There were 121 housing units at an average density of 96.4 per square mile (37.1/km). The racial makeup of the CDP was 97.39% White, 0.43% Native American, and 2.17% from two or more races. Hispanic or Latino of any race were 0.43% of the population.

There were 104 households, out of which 25.0% had children under the age of 18 living with them, 54.8% were married couples living together, 5.8% had a female householder with no husband present, and 35.6% were non-families. 32.7% of all households were made up of individuals, and 12.5% had someone living alone who was 65 years of age or older. The average household size was 2.21 and the average family size was 2.82.

In the CDP, the population was spread out, with 23.5% under the age of 18, 3.5% from 18 to 24, 22.6% from 25 to 44, 37.0% from 45 to 64, and 13.5% who were 65 years of age or older. The median age was 46 years. For every 100 females, there were 93.3 males. For every 100 females age 18 and over, there were 89.2 males.

The median income for a household in the CDP was $30,583, and the median income for a family was $35,156. Males had a median income of $36,250 versus $21,000 for females. The per capita income for the CDP was $14,350. About 10.1% of families and 14.7% of the population were below the poverty line, including 20.0% of those under the age of eighteen and 10.5% of those 65 or over.

Education
Noxon Public Schools educates students from kindergarten through 12th grade. Noxon High School's team name is the Red Devils.

References

Census-designated places in Sanders County, Montana
Census-designated places in Montana